The olive sunbird (Cyanomitra olivacea) is a species of sunbird found in a large part of Africa south of the Sahel. It prefers forested regions, and is absent from drier, more open regions such as the Horn of Africa and most of south-central and south-western Africa. It is sometimes placed in the genus Nectarinia.

The western subspecies (roughly west of the East African Rift) are sometimes split as the western olive sunbird, Cyanomitra obscura, in which case Cyanomitra olivacea becomes the eastern olive sunbird

References

Further reading

External links
 Olive sunbird - Species text in The Atlas of Southern African Birds.

olive sunbird
Birds of the Gulf of Guinea
Birds of Sub-Saharan Africa
olive sunbird
Taxonomy articles created by Polbot